Siniša Skelin (born 14 July 1974, in Split) is a Croatian rower who has won two Olympic medals. At the 2004 Summer Olympics in Athens he won a silver medal in coxless pairs with his younger brother Nikša.

References
Official Olympic reports

External links
 Official site of the Skelin brothers

1974 births
Living people
Croatian male rowers
Rowers at the 1996 Summer Olympics
Rowers at the 2000 Summer Olympics
Rowers at the 2004 Summer Olympics
Rowers at the 2008 Summer Olympics
Olympic silver medalists for Croatia
Olympic bronze medalists for Croatia
Olympic rowers of Croatia
Rowers from Split, Croatia
Olympic medalists in rowing
Medalists at the 2004 Summer Olympics
World Rowing Championships medalists for Croatia
Medalists at the 2000 Summer Olympics